CBAT may refer to:

 CBAT-DT, a television station licensed to Fredericton, New Brunswick, Canada
 Central Bureau for Astronomical Telegrams
 Confederação Brasileira de Atletismo
 Column-based analytical technology
 Can't Buy a Thrill, Steely Dan's 1972 debut
 "Cbat", a song from Hudson Mohawke's 2011 EP Satin Panthers